The Breakers Palm Beach is a historic, Renaissance Revival style luxury hotel with 538 rooms. It is located at 1 South County Road in Palm Beach, Florida.

Early history
First known as The Palm Beach Inn, the original hotel was opened on January 16, 1896, by business tycoon Henry Flagler to accommodate travelers on his Florida East Coast Railway. It occupied the beachfront portion of the grounds of the Royal Poinciana Hotel, which Flagler had opened in 1894 beside Lake Worth Lagoon, facing the inland waterway. Guests began requesting rooms "over by the breakers", so Flagler renamed it The Breakers Hotel in 1901.

The original wooden hotel burned on June 9, 1903, after which it was rebuilt, opening on February 1, 1904. Rooms started at $4 per night, including three meals a day (in 2018, rooms started at $1,050 per night). Since Flagler forbade motorized vehicles on the property, patrons were delivered between the two hotels in wheeled chairs powered by employees. The grounds featured a nine-hole golf course.

Pre-Negro leagues, Winter League baseball team

In the winter of 1915–1916, the Breakers Hotel hired the services of Cyclone Joe Williams and many fellow team members of the Lincoln Giants pre-Negro leagues baseball team to take on another pre-Negro leagues baseball team made up of Indianapolis ABCs players hosted by the Royal Poinciana Hotel. The games hosted Negro league baseball stars of the day, including Ben Taylor, C.I. Taylor, Candy Jim Taylor, John Donaldson, Ashby Dunbar, Jim Jeffries, Jimmie Lyons, Bill Francis, Blainey Hall, Dick Wallace, Louis Santop, and Spot Poles. One newspaper column claimed that "Astors, Vanderbilts, Morgans, and hundreds of others, who never see a ball game outside of Palm Beach... (are) rooting hard for their favorite team.

1925 fire and subsequent years

Twelve years after Flagler's death, The Breakers Hotel burned down again, on March 18, 1925; the fire was started by an electric curling iron that had been left on. The architectural firm hired by the Flagler heirs, Schultze and Weaver, modeled the 550-room replacement building after the Villa Medici in Rome, Italy. The firm worked with New York-based Turner Construction Company and a well-known local Palm Beach contractor, Eugene Hammond, who built the first theater in West Palm Beach and worked on the Palm Beach estate built for Rodman Wanamaker by Addison Mizner (which would become a Kennedy winter retreat in 1933).

The contractors decided to abandon the wooden construction for fireproof concrete. Built by 1,200 construction workers, the hotel reopened on December 29, 1926, to considerable acclaim. The lobby ceiling was painted by Alexander Bonanno, a classically trained New York City artist who taught at Cooper Union. This hotel influenced the Hotel Nacional in Havana, Cuba.

The Breakers Hotel was listed on the National Register of Historic Places in 1973. The  listed area included 15 contributing buildings and one other contributing object.

On April 18, 2012, the AIA's Florida Chapter ranked the hotel seventh on its list of "Florida Architecture: 100 Years. 100 Places". Today, the hotel and grounds occupy 140 acres (57 hectares) beside the Atlantic Ocean.

Awards
The Breakers is currently a AAA five diamond rated resort and has maintained this rating since 1996.

U.S. News & World Report: Best Hotels in the USA & Florida

Forbes Travel Guide: The Breakers Palm Beach, Four-Stars & The Spa at The Breakers, Five-Stars

References
 The Breakers: More Than a Century of History 
 Florida, DK Eyewitness Travel Guides, 2004, pg. 119

External links
 

Palm Beach County listings, Florida's Office of Cultural and Historical Programs
"It's De Limit"  Forbes article by Finn-Olaf Jones on The Breakers' architects Schultze & Weaver, April 24, 2006
The Breakers Historical Timeline

Florida East Coast Railway
Historic American Buildings Survey in Florida
Hotel buildings completed in 1925
Hotel buildings on the National Register of Historic Places in Florida
Hotels in Palm Beach, Florida
Mediterranean Revival architecture in Florida
National Register of Historic Places in Palm Beach County, Florida
Railway hotels in the United States
Seaside resorts in Florida
Shingle Style architecture in Florida
Hotels established in 1925
1925 establishments in Florida
Burned hotels in the United States

zh:博瑞克斯酒店